Lithuania can be divided into historical and cultural regions (called ethnographic regions). The exact borders are not fully clear, as the regions are not official political or administrative units. They are delimited by culture, such as country traditions, traditional lifestyle, songs, tales, etc. To some extent, regions correspond to the zones of Lithuanian language dialects. This correspondence, however, is by no means strict. For example, although the Dzūkian dialect is called South Aukštaitian, it does not mean that Dzūkija is part of Aukštaitija. In certain parts of some regions, dialects of other regions are spoken, while for example in Samogitia, there are three indigenous dialects (southern, northern and western Samogitian), some of which are subdivided into subdialects.

Regions in politics
No region, except for Samogitia, has ever been a political or an administrative entity. However, some work was done recently to delimit their boundaries more clearly, as there is a project to change the system of counties in Lithuania into ethnographic regions, which would be called lands (singular - žemė, plural - žemės). This project is also supported by the view that with the limited functions of counties, 10 of them are not needed for Lithuania. Another supporting argument is that in other countries historical territories are being revived, while in Lithuania artificially made counties exist. The project was supported by the former president Rolandas Paksas, yet now it is not clear when or if the project will be completed at all. However, Dzūkija quite recently adopted the coat of arms and emblem which would be used in case the reform were to be implemented.  Alytus County, which lies almost entirely within Dzūkija, adopted soon thereafter a coat of arms that is based on the Dzūkija coat of arms. Samogitia has a flag and a coat of arms dating from the time of the Duchy of Samogitia;  these symbols are considerably older than the flag of Lithuania. Lithuania Minor has a flag used since the 17th century, and an anthem originating from the 19th century. However, if the reform were to be implemented, most likely there would be just 4 lands, not 5, because most of Lithuania minor is located within the modern borders of Russia (in the Kaliningrad Oblast) and many Lithuanians were expelled from there.  The relatively small remaining part is also populated mostly by relative newcomers, as much of the local population died in the Second World War or was expelled. Therefore, Lithuania minor would probably be attached to Samogitia.

Despite the fact that the regions are not political/administrative entities, most regions have their "capitals" (cities which are commonly considered to be capitals). These cities are not necessarily the largest in the region.

List of regions

See also 
 Counties of Lithuania
 Ethnographic Lithuania
 Geography of Lithuania
 Historical regions of Central Europe

References 

Lithuania